Toony Tube is a Spanish television series created for Cartoon Network by Santiago Castillo Linares. Toony Tube is presented by a puppet that resembles a young boy with blond hair with thick black rimmed glasses which wears a gaming headset and it is just like a typical Let's Player on YouTube.

The show premiered originally in Spain on Boing on July 21, 2018. An English version of the show premiered in August 2018 on Cartoon Network UK, starring Andy Davies, a former Cartoon Network UK announcer from 15 December 2013 to 24 July 2016, as the voice of Toony.

Episodes
The episodes are listed in order of production.

Season 1 (2018–19)

References 	

British children's animated comedy television series
Cartoon Network original programming